Walter Harrison's A New and Universal History, Description and Survey of the Cities of London and Westminster, the Borough of Southwark, and their Adjacent Parts... is a 1775 book illustrated with 102 monochrome plates, describing the appearance of London at that time. It was published by John Cooke in 70 parts. These were issued weekly, each with one or two of the plates. The illustrations were prints made using engraved copper plates.

References

Further reading 

 Adams, Bernard (1983) London Illustrated 1604-1850: a survey and index of topographical books and their plates
 Crace, John Gregory (1878) A Catalogue of Maps, Plans and Views of London, Westminster and Southwark

External links 
 

1775 non-fiction books
1770s in London
Books about London
Illustrated books